The British Ceylon period is the history of Sri Lanka between 1815 and 1948. It follows the fall of the Kandyan Kingdom into the hands of the British Empire. It ended over 2300 years of Sinhalese monarchy rule on the island. The British rule on the island lasted until 1948 when the country regained independence following the Sri Lankan independence movement.

Overview
Periodization of Sri Lanka history:

Background

Portuguese and Dutch presence

The first Europeans to visit Ceylon in modern times were the Portuguese: Lourenço de Almeida arrived in 1505, finding the island divided into seven warring kingdoms and unable to fend off intruders. The Portuguese founded a fort at the port city of Colombo in 1517 and gradually extended their control over the coastal areas. In 1592 the Sinhalese moved their capital to the inland city of Kandy, a location more secure against attack from invaders. Intermittent warfare continued through the 16th century. Many Lowland Ceylonese were forced to convert to Christianity while the coastal Moors were religiously persecuted and forced to retreat to the Central highlands while some of them desired to leave the country. The Buddhist majority disliked Portuguese occupation and its influences and welcomed any power who might rescue them and defeat the Portuguese. In 1602, therefore, when the Dutch captain Joris van Spilbergen landed, the king of Kandy appealed to him for help.

It was in 1669 that the Dutch attacked in earnest but ended with an agreement (which was disrespected by both parties), and not until 1656 that Colombo fell. By 1660 the Dutch controlled the whole island except the kingdom of Kandy. The Dutch (who were Protestants) persecuted the Catholics (the left-over Portuguese settlers) but left the Buddhists, Hindus and Muslims alone. However, they taxed the people far more heavily than the Portuguese had done. A mixed Dutch-Sri Lankan people known as Burgher people are the legacy of Dutch rule.

In 1669, the British sea captain Robert Knox landed by chance on Ceylon and was captured by the king of Kandy. He escaped 19 years later and wrote an account of his stay. This helped to bring the island to the attention of the British.

British presence
During the Napoleonic Wars, Great Britain, fearing that French control of the Netherlands might deliver Ceylon to the French, occupied the coastal areas of the island with little difficulty in 1796. In 1802 by the Treaty of Amiens the Dutch part of the island was ceded to Britain and became a crown colony. In 1803 the British invaded the Kingdom of Kandy in the 1st Kandyan War, but were bloodily repulsed. In 1815 Kandy was captured in the Second Kandyan War, ending Ceylonese independence.

British rule

Following the suppression of the Uva Rebellion, the Kandyan peasantry was stripped of their lands by the Crown Lands (Encroachments) Ordinance No. 12 of 1840 (sometimes called the Crown Lands Ordinance or the Waste Lands Ordinance), a modern enclosure movement and reduced to penury. The British found that the uplands of Sri Lanka were very suited to coffee, tea and rubber cultivation, and by the mid-19th century Ceylon tea had become a staple of the British market, bringing great wealth to a small class of European tea planters. To work the estates, the planters imported large numbers of Tamil workers as indentured labourers from south India, who soon made up 10% of the island's population. These workers lived in harsh conditions and were accommodated in line rooms, not very different from cattle sheds.

The British colonial government favoured the semi-European Burghers, certain high-caste Sinhalese and the Tamils who were mainly concentrated to the north of the country while ignoring the other ethnic groups on the island. Nevertheless, the British also introduced democratic elements to Sri Lanka for the first time in its history. The Burghers were given some degree of self-government as early as 1833. It was not until 1909 that constitutional development began with a partly elected assembly, and not until 1920 that elected members outnumbered official appointees. Universal suffrage was introduced in 1931, over the protests of the Sinhalese, Tamil and Burgher elite who objected to the common people being allowed to vote.

Independence movement

The Ceylon National Congress (CNC) was founded to agitate for greater autonomy. The party soon split along ethnic and caste lines. Prof. K. M. de Silva, the famous Peradeniya historian has pointed out that the refusal of the Ceylon Tamils to accept minority status to be one of the main causes which broke up the CNC. The CNC did not seek independence or "Swaraj". What may be called the independence movement broke into two streams, viz., the "constitutionalists", who sought independence by gradual modification of the status of Ceylon, and the more radical groups associated with the Colombo Youth League, Labour movement of Goonasinghe, and the Jaffna Youth Congress. These organizations were the first to raise the cry of Swaraj, or outright independence, following the Indian example, when Jawaharlal Nehru, Sarojini Naidu and other Indian leaders visited Ceylon in 1926. The efforts of the constitutionalists led to the arrival of the Donoughmore Commission reforms (1931) and the Soulbury Commission recommendations, which essentially upheld the 1944 draft constitution of the Board of ministers headed by D. S. Senanayake. The Marxist Lanka Sama Samaja Party (LSSP), which grew out of the Youth Leagues in 1935, made the demand for outright independence a cornerstone of their policy. Its deputies in the State Council, N.M. Perera and Philip Gunawardena, were aided in this struggle by Colvin R. de Silva, Leslie Goonewardene, Vivienne Goonewardene, Edmund Samarakkody and K. Natesa Iyer. They also demanded the replacement of English as the official language by Sinhala and Tamil. The Marxist groups were a tiny minority and yet their movement was viewed with grave suspicion by the British administration. The concerted (but ineffective) attempts to rouse the public against the British Raj in revolt would have led to certain bloodshed and a delay in independence. British state papers released in the 1950s show that the Marxist movement had a very negative impact on the policy makers at the Colonial office.

The Soulbury Commission was the most important result of the agitation for constitutional reform in the 1930s. The Tamil leadership had by then fallen into the hands of G. G. Ponnambalam who had rejected the "Ceylonese identity". Ponnamblam had declared himself a "proud Dravidian", and attempted to establish an independent identity for the Tamils. Ponnamblam was a politician who attacked the Sinhalese, and their historical chronicle known as the Mahavamsa. One such inflamed attack in Navalapitiya led to the first Sinhala-Tamil riot in 1939. Ponnambalam opposed universal franchise, supported the caste system, and claimed that the protection of Tamil rights requires the Tamils (45% of the population in 1931) having an equal number of seats in parliament to that of the Sinhalese (about 72% of the population). This "50-50" or "balanced representation" policy became the hallmark of Tamil politics of the time. Ponnambalam also accused the British of having established colonization in "traditional Tamil areas", and having favoured the Buddhists by the Buddhist temporalities act. The Soulbury Commission rejected these submissions by Ponnambalam, and even noted their unacceptable communal character. Sinhalese writers pointed out the large immigration of Tamils to the southern urban centres, especially after the opening of the Jaffna-Colombo railway. Meanwhile, Senanayake, Baron Jayatilleke, Oliver Gunatilleke and others lobbied the Soulbury Commission without confronting them officially. The unofficial submissions contained what was to later become the draft constitution of 1944.

The close collaboration of the D. S. Senanayake government with the war-time British administration led to the support of Lord Louis Mountbatten. His dispatches and a telegram to the Colonial office supporting Independence for Ceylon have been cited by historians as having helped the Senanayake government to secure the independence of Sri Lanka. The shrewd cooperation with the British as well as diverting the needs of the war market to Ceylonese markets as a supply point, managed by Oliver Goonatilleke, also led to a very favourable fiscal situation for the newly independent government.

Second World War

During World War II, Sri Lanka was a front-line British base against the Japanese. Opposition to the war in Sri Lanka was orchestrated by Marxist organizations. The leaders of the LSSP pro-independence agitation were arrested by the Colonial authorities. On 5 April 1942, the Japanese Navy bombed Colombo, which led to the flight of Indian merchants, dominant in the Colombo commercial sector. This flight removed a major political problem facing the Senanayake government. Marxist leaders also escaped, to India, where they participated in the independence struggle there. The movement in Ceylon was minuscule, limited to the English educated intelligentsia and trade unions, mainly in the urban centres. These groups were led by Robert Gunawardena, Philip's brother. In stark contrast to this "heroic" but ineffective approach to the war, the Senanayake government took advantage of the war to further its rapport with the commanding elite. Ceylon became crucial to the British Empire in the war, with Lord Louis Mountbatten using Colombo as his headquarters for the Eastern Theater. Oliver Goonatilleka successfully exploited the markets for the country's rubber and other agricultural products to replenish the treasury. Nonetheless, Sinhalese continued to agitate for independence and Sinhalese sovereignty, using the opportunities offered by the war to establish a special relationship with Britain.

Meanwhile, the Marxists, identifying the war as a sideshow between rival empires and desiring a proletarian revolution, chose a path of agitation disproportionate to their negligible combat strength and diametrically opposed to the "constitutionalist" approach of Senanayake and other Ethnic Sinhalese leaders. A small garrison on the Cocos Islands, crewed by Ceylonese, attempted to expel the British. It has been claimed that the LSSP had some hand in the action, though this is far from clear. Three of the participants were the only British Subject Peoples to be shot for "mutiny" during World War II.

Sri Lankans in Singapore and Malaysia formed the 'Lanka Regiment' of the Indian National Army.

The constitutionalists, led by D. S. Senanayake, succeeded in winning independence. The Soulbury constitution was essentially what Senanayake's board of ministers had drafted in 1944. The promise of Dominion status, and independence itself, had been given by the Colonial office.

Post-war
The Sinhalese leader Don Stephen Senanayake left the CNC on the issue of independence, disagreeing with the revised aim of 'the achieving of freedom', although his real reasons were more subtle. He subsequently formed the United National Party (UNP) in 1946, when a new constitution was agreed on, based on the behind-the-curtain lobbying of the Soulbury Commission. At the elections of 1947, the UNP won a minority of the seats in Parliament but cobbled together a coalition with the Sinhala Maha Sabha of Solomon Bandaranaike and the Tamil Congress of G.G. Ponnambalam. The successful inclusions of the Tamil-communalist leader Ponnambalam, and his Sinhala counterpart Bandaranaike were a remarkable political balancing act by Senanayake. However, the vacuum in Tamil Nationalist politics created by Ponnamblam's transition to a moderate opened the field for the Tamil Arasu Kachchi, a Tamil sovereignist party (rendered into English as the "Federal" party) led by S. J. V. Chelvanaykam, the lawyer son of a Christian minister.

See also
 History of Sri Lanka
 1906 malaria outbreak in Ceylon

References

 
British Ceylon